Teemu Lassila (born 26 March 1983) is a Finnish former professional ice hockey goaltender. He most recently played in the 2019–20 season of the Austrian Hockey League (EBEL) with the Czech team Orli Znojmo. He participated at the 2011 IIHF World Championship as a member of the Finland men's national ice hockey team.

Lassila was selected by the Nashville Predators in the 4th round (117th overall) of the 2003 NHL Entry Draft, but he never played in the National Hockey League.

References

External links
 

1983 births
Living people
HC '05 Banská Bystrica players
Avangard Omsk players
Barys Nur-Sultan players
Djurgårdens IF Hockey players
Finnish expatriate ice hockey players in the Czech Republic
Finnish expatriate ice hockey players in Kazakhstan
Finnish expatriate ice hockey players in Russia
Finnish expatriate ice hockey players in Slovakia
Finnish expatriate ice hockey players in Sweden
Finnish ice hockey goaltenders
Kokkolan Hermes players
HPK players
Kiekko-Vantaa players
Lempäälän Kisa players
Metallurg Novokuznetsk players
Nashville Predators draft picks
Orli Znojmo players
Tappara players
HC TPS players
Växjö Lakers players
Ässät players
Ice hockey people from Helsinki